'Lodra )Lodra is an area like small town in Sindh. Lodra is situated nearby to Goth Ubaidullah, and close to Goth Amal Khan Baloch.
Shikarpur railway station is located in Shikarpur city, Shikarpur district of Sindh province of the Pakistan. Shikarpur railway station is situated 4 km south of Lodra.

See also
Sultan Kot
Shikarpur, Sindh
Jacobabad

References 

Populated places in Shikarpur District